Nemesia denticulata, the toothed aloha, is a species of flowering plant  in the genus Nemesia of the figwort family Scrophulariaceae, native to South Africa. A matforming perennial useful for borders, it has gained the Royal Horticultural Society's Award of Garden Merit. 

The Latin specific epithet denticulata means "slightly toothed", referring to the notched petal edges.

References

denticulata
Endemic flora of South Africa
Plants described in 1941